Åsa Lindestam (born 24 April 1956) is a Swedish social democratic politician. She was a member of the Riksdag from 2002 to 2022 and deputy speaker from 2018 to 2022. She is a member of the Committee on Defence and a Swedish member of the Organization for Security and Co-operation in Europe.

References

External links
Åsa Lindestam at the Riksdag website

Members of the Riksdag 2002–2006
Living people
1956 births
Women members of the Riksdag
21st-century Swedish women politicians
Members of the Riksdag from the Social Democrats
Members of the Riksdag 2006–2010
Members of the Riksdag 2010–2014
Members of the Riksdag 2014–2018
Members of the Riksdag 2018–2022